William Donald Borders (October 9, 1913 – April 19, 2010) was an American prelate of the Roman Catholic Church. He was the 13th Archbishop of Baltimore from 1974 to 1989, having previously served as the first Bishop of Orlando from 1968 to 1974.

Early life and education
Borders was born in Washington, Indiana, the third of seven children of Thomas Martin and Zelpha Ann (née Queen) Borders. His birth came during a flood that lifted his family's house off its foundation and forced the physician to reach their house by boat. After attending Catholic elementary and high school, he began his studies for the priesthood at Saint Meinrad's Seminary in 1932.

He transferred to the Archdiocese of New Orleans in Louisiana in 1936 after Archbishop Joseph Rummel made an appeal for priests and seminarians. He completed his studies at Notre Dame Seminary in New Orleans.

Priesthood
Borders was ordained a priest by Archbishop Rummel on May 18, 1940. He then served as an associate pastor at  Sacred Heart Church in Baton Rouge, Louisiana until 1943, when he enlisted in the U.S. Army Chaplain Corps during World War II. He received a month's training at Harvard University before becoming a battalion chaplain with the 362nd Infantry Regiment of the 91st Infantry Division.  His regiment trained in North Africa for the Italian Campaign.  During an attack on a German position near Florence in 1944, Borders carried a wounded American soldier to safety while under machine gun fire, for which he was awarded the Bronze Star for Valor.

In 1946, Borders left the military service with the rank of Major and returned to Louisiana. He briefly served as an associate pastor at Our Lady of Prompt Succor Church in Westwego, Louisiana before pursuing a graduate degree at the University of Notre Dame in his native Indiana.  After earning a Master of Science degree in Education in 1947, he resumed his pastoral ministry in Louisiana as associate pastor at Our Lady of Lourdes Church in New Orleans.  He became an assistant chaplain of the Newman Centre at Louisiana State University, eventually rising to become its chaplain. During his tenure at LSU, he spent a summer in Guatemala to better serve his Hispanic students.

Borders served at LSU until 1964, except for a two-year period (1957–1959) when he served as pastor of  Holy Family Church in Port Allen, Louisiana.  The assignment was his first pastorate, and he there demonstrated his concern for racial equality by ending segregation at the church. He burned the ropes that sectioned off the African American parishioners, who gradually integrated throughout the church.

In 1961, when the Diocese of Baton Rouge was created out of the Archdiocese of New Orleans, Borders was attached to the new diocese.  He was raised to the rank of Domestic Prelate by Pope Paul VI in 1963, and named rector of St. Joseph Catholic School the following year.  He also served as a diocesan consultor, director of seminarians, and moderator for the diocesan councils of Catholic Men and Women, and co-founded of St. Joseph Cathedral Preparatory School. He attended the last two sessions of the Second Vatican Council as a peritus, or theological expert, on the priesthood and ecumenical relations.

Episcopacy

Orlando
On May 2, 1968, Borders was appointed the first Bishop of the newly erected Diocese of Orlando, Florida.  He received his episcopal consecration on the following June 14 from Archbishop Luigi Raimondi, with Bishops Robert Emmet Tracy and Louis Abel Caillouet serving as co-consecrators. He selected as his episcopal motto: "Auscultabo ut Serviam" (Latin: "I listen that I may serve").

During his tenure in Orlando, Borders laid the foundations for the new diocese while also implementing the directives of the Second Vatican Council. He oversaw the creation of parish councils and education boards, allowed the laity to serve as extraordinary ministers of Holy Communion, and formed a Sisters' Council for the nuns of the diocese. He created a Social Services Board to correlate the work of already-existing agencies, and developed a comprehensive educational program aimed at coordinating efforts in Catholics schools, campus ministry, and religious education.  He also initiated social outreach centers to minister to migrant workers and the poor.

Borders once described himself as the "Bishop of the Moon" since the Diocese of Orlando encompassed Cape Canaveral, from where Apollo 11 launched in 1969. According to the Code of Canon Law in effect at the time, any newly discovered territory fell under the jurisdiction of the diocese whence the expedition left.

Baltimore
Following the retirement of Cardinal Lawrence Shehan, Borders was appointed the 13th Archbishop of Baltimore, Maryland, on March 25, 1974.  He was formally installed at the Cathedral of Mary Our Queen on June 26 of that year. He received the pallium, a vestment worn by metropolitan bishops, from Pope Paul VI at St. Peter's Basilica on March 24, 1975. As head of the nation's oldest Catholic diocese, he held the status of primus inter pares among the American Catholic bishops.

During his 15-year tenure in Baltimore, Borders divided the archdiocese into three vicariates and appointed his auxiliary bishops as vicars over them.  He reorganized the Archdiocesan Central Services, naming cabinet-level secretaries to carry out the administrative work of the archdiocese.  He clarified and strengthened the role of the Archdiocesan Pastoral Council, and combined the Board of Consultors and the Senate of Priests to form the Priests' Council. He initiated a Department of Pastoral Planning and Management looking to the future needs of the archdiocese, an Office of Fund Development to carry out an effective stewardship program, and an evangelization effort to reach the "unchurched" in the Archdiocese. Instead of living at the residence at the Basilica of the Assumption, he lived alone at the former sexton's lodge, which is now the gift shop of the basilica.

Borders became what Baltimore Magazine called the "king of the soup kitchens".  Under his leadership in Baltimore, the budget for Catholic Charities grew from $2.5 million a year to $33 million a year, and its staff grew from 200 to more than 1,000.  He regularly lobbied members of Congress and other government officials on behalf of the disadvantaged. In the fall of 1981, in company with other leading Catholic educators, he made a three-week tour of the People's Republic of China to investigate the possibilities for an exchange of cultural and educational programs between that nation and the United States.

Borders was among those named in two lawsuits involving clergy sexual abuse, one in Baltimore in 1993 and another in Orlando in 2003.  In both cases, he was accused of knowing about alleged abuse by priests in his dioceses but avoiding action against them.  The conditions of the Baltimore settlement remain confidential; the Orlando case was settled without Borders' admitting any wrongdoing.

As a member of the United States Conference of Catholic Bishops, he chaired the Committee on Education and served on the Committee on Human Values, the Administrative Board of the U.S. Catholic Conference, and the Administrative Committee of the National Conference of Catholic Bishops. He also chaired the Ad Hoc Committee for the Bicentennial of the U.S. Hierarchy.

Later life and death
After reaching the mandatory retirement age of 75, Borders submitted his letter of resignation to Pope John Paul II, who accepted his resignation on April 6, 1989. His successor was William H. Keeler, then serving as Bishop of Harrisburg, Pennsylvania.

In 2003, Borders moved to the Mercy Ridge Retirement Community in Lutherville, Maryland.  He later moved to Stella Maris Hospice in nearby Timonium, Maryland, after being diagnosed with colon cancer. He died at Stella Maris at age 96 — the fourth-oldest living Catholic bishop in the United States, and the longest-surviving of the bishops of both Orlando and Baltimore.

See also

 Catholic Church hierarchy
 Catholic Church in the United States
 Historical list of the Catholic bishops of the United States
 List of Catholic bishops of the United States
 Lists of patriarchs, archbishops, and bishops

References

External links
 Most Rev. William D. Borders, 13th Archbishop of Baltimore (Ordinaries Detail) – Archdiocese of Baltimore.
 Coat of Arms of His Excellency The Most Reverend William Donald Borders, D.D. Archbishop of Baltimore – Archdiocese of Baltimore.
 Basilica of the National Shrine of the Assumption of the Blessed Virgin Mary
 Cathedral of Mary Our Queen
 Roman Catholic Archdiocese of Baltimore
 Roman Catholic Diocese of Orlando

Episcopal succession

1913 births
2010 deaths
People from Washington, Indiana
Participants in the Second Vatican Council
Roman Catholic archbishops of Baltimore
People from New Orleans
Roman Catholic bishops of Orlando
University of Notre Dame alumni
20th-century Roman Catholic archbishops in the United States
World War II chaplains
United States Army chaplains
People from Lutherville, Maryland
Louisiana State University people
United States Army personnel of World War II
Catholics from Louisiana
Catholics from Indiana